Coulon is a surname. Notable people with the surname include:

Jean-Daniel Coulon (1981-   ),
Australian Professional Golfer and Founder of golfstudio
George David Coulon (1822–1904), American painter
Georges Coulon (1838–1912), Former Vice President of the French Council of State
Jean-François Coulon (1764-1836), French ballet dancer and teacher
Jean-Michel Coulon (1920–2014), French painter
Jocelyn Coulon (born 1957), Quebec author, researcher and former federal election candidate
Johnny Coulon (1889–1973), American boxer
Cécile Coulon (born 1990), French novelist and poet